This is a list of episodes from the sixth season of Barney Miller.

Broadcast history
The season originally aired Thursdays at 9:00-9:30 pm (EST).

Episodes

References

Barney Miller seasons
1979 American television seasons
1980 American television seasons